is a passenger railway station located in the town of Ōiso, Kanagawa Prefecture, Japan, operated by the East Japan Railway Company (JR East).

Lines
Ōiso Station is served by the Tōkaidō Main Line, with some through services via the Shōnan-Shinjuku Line.

Station layout
The station has a single island platform serving two tracks, connected to the station building by a footbridge. The station has a Midori no Madoguchi staffed ticket office.

Platforms

History
Ōiso Station opened on July 11, 1887 on the Tokaido Main Line of the Japanese Government Railways (JGR). With the dissolution and privatization of the Japanese National Railways (successor of JGR) on April 1, 1987, the station came under the control of JR East. Automated turnstiles using the Suica IC Card system came into operation from November 18, 2001.

Passenger statistics
In fiscal 2019, the station was used by an average of 8,053 passengers daily (boarding passengers only).

The passenger figures (boarding passengers only) for previous years are as shown below.

Surrounding area
Oiso Beach
Oiso Long Beach, outdoor swimming pool resort
Kanagawa Prefectural Oiso High School

See also
List of railway stations in Japan

References
Yoshikawa, Fumio. Tokaido-sen 130-nen no ayumi. Grand-Prix Publishing (2002) .

External links

JR East station information 

Railway stations in Kanagawa Prefecture
Shōnan-Shinjuku Line
Railway stations in Japan opened in 1887
Ōiso